The red-billed helmetshrike or chestnut-bellied helmetshrike (Prionops caniceps) is a species of bird in the Vanga family, Vangidae, formerly usually included in the Malaconotidae.

It is found in West Africa, occurring in Benin, Cameroon, Ivory Coast, Ghana, Guinea, Liberia, Mali, Nigeria, Sierra Leone and Togo. In Central Africa it is replaced by the rufous-bellied helmet-shrike (P. rufiventris) which is sometimes regarded as a subspecies of the chestnut-bellied Helmetshrike.

Its natural habitats are subtropical or tropical moist lowland forest and subtropical or tropical moist shrubland.

References

 African Bird Club (2008) ABC African Checklist: Passerines Accessed 20/08/08.

red-billed helmetshrike
Birds of West Africa
red-billed helmetshrike
red-billed helmetshrike
Taxonomy articles created by Polbot